Adalberto Scorza (born 2 March 1938) is an Argentine racewalker. He competed in the men's 50 kilometres walk at the 1972 Summer Olympics.

References

1938 births
Living people
Athletes (track and field) at the 1971 Pan American Games
Athletes (track and field) at the 1972 Summer Olympics
Athletes (track and field) at the 1975 Pan American Games
Argentine male racewalkers
Olympic athletes of Argentina
Place of birth missing (living people)
Pan American Games competitors for Argentina